Serhiy Chebotayev (born 7 March 1988) is a professional Ukrainian football defender.

References 
Profile on Official Site (Rus)

External links

1988 births
Living people
Footballers from Zaporizhzhia
Ukrainian footballers
Association football defenders
Ukrainian expatriate footballers
Expatriate footballers in Belarus
Ukrainian Premier League players
FC Volyn Lutsk players
FC Stal Alchevsk players
FC Stal-2 Alchevsk players
FC Helios Kharkiv players
FC Poltava players
FC Hirnyk-Sport Horishni Plavni players
FC Oleksandriya players
SC Dnipro-1 players
NK Veres Rivne players
FC Slutsk players
FC Kremin Kremenchuk players
SC Tavriya Simferopol players
Ukrainian expatriate sportspeople in Belarus